International Monetary Fund Managing Director 2011 election The selection process for the new Managing Director of the IMF in 2011 presents characteristics that have never been seen. The balance of power that held the unwritten rule that assigned the leading position of the IMF to a European seems to be changing as the developing nations acquire more weight. In particular the BRIC nations, together with South Africa and Mexico, have expressed their strong opposition to assign the Managing Director position based on geographical characteristics as opposed to a merit-based approach.

Candidates 
The two openly announced formal candidates were Agustín Carstens, Mexico´s Central Bank Governor, and Christine Lagarde, France´s Minister of Finance. The statements and resumes of the candidates present their personal backgrounds and their perspectives on the role of the IMF.  The election was won by Christine Lagarde.

References 

Managing Director 2011 election